MV Lochnevis is a Caledonian Maritime Assets ferry, launched in 2000. She is operated by Caledonian MacBrayne, serving the Small Isles of Scotland.

History
Lochnevis was launched by Rev. Alan Lamb and Sarah Boyack  at Ailsa Shipbuilding, Troon on 6 May 2000 and entered service on 1 November 2001.

Layout
Lochnevis appearance is dominated by a large stern vehicle ramp. This allows her to berth a considerable distance from a slipway, protecting her exposed Azimuth thrusters in shallow waters. She can carry 190 passengers and 14 cars, although due to vehicle restrictions on the Small Isles, she usually carries few vehicles. The car deck is also used for goods for the islands. The starboard gangway entrance is used at Canna.

Forward of the car deck is crew accommodation, with the cafeteria, serving area, and galley above. On the next deck, the observation lounge has seating arranged diagonally. Officers' accommodation lies forward of the lounge, while heavy side doors lead to the open deck.

Passengers can enjoy the view ahead from an open bow – a rarity on current ferries. Aft of the lounge is outside seating, again laid out in a diagonal arrangement. Further aft are the fast rescue craft (port) and a single funnel and the hydraulic goods crane (starboard).

Service
Lochnevis replaced the 20-year-old  on the Small Isles service. She serves the islands of Eigg, Canna, Rùm and Muck from Mallaig, taking 7 hours for a round of the four islands, compared with ten hours by her predecessor. Initially, Lochnevis, like Lochmor, at islands apart from Canna, was met by a ferry boat. In the years following her introduction, new piers and slipways have been built on all the islands, allowing Lochnevis to berth stern-to.

During the winter, Lochnevis adds the MallaigArmadale roster.

References

External links
MV Lochnevis on www.calmac.co.uk

Caledonian MacBrayne
2000 ships
Ships built in Scotland
Transport in Highland (council area)
Small Isles, Lochaber